Dolichoderus gordoni is a species of ant in the genus Dolichoderus. Described by Shattuck and Marsden in 2013, the species is only known from southern Queensland in Australia, mainly around forested areas.

References

Dolichoderus
Hymenoptera of Australia
Insects described in 2013